Shaw Branch is a stream in Bates County in the U.S. state of Missouri. It is a tributary of the Osage River.

Shaw Branch has the name of William Shaw, an early settler.

See also
List of rivers of Missouri

References

Rivers of Bates County, Missouri
Rivers of Missouri